Gabriel Maurice Mandrillon (23 August 1902 – 11 February 1981) was a French skier. He was the brother of Camille Mandrillon.

Mandrillon was born in Les Rousses. In 1923, he was fourth in the international ranking of ski jumping. He was a member of the national Olympic military patrol team in 1924 which placed third. At the 1928 Winter Olympics he finished 33rd at the 18 km cross-country skiing event. He died in Lons-le-Saunier.

References 

1902 births
1981 deaths
French military patrol (sport) runners
French male cross-country skiers
French male ski jumpers
Olympic biathletes of France
Olympic cross-country skiers of France
Military patrol competitors at the 1924 Winter Olympics
Cross-country skiers at the 1928 Winter Olympics
Olympic bronze medalists for France
People from Les Rousses
Medalists at the 1924 Winter Olympics
Sportspeople from Jura (department)
20th-century French people